The Mastery of John Coltrane, Vol. I: Feelin' Good is a compilation album by American saxophonist John Coltrane, the first of a series of four compilations released on Impulse! between 1978 and 1979, all sharing the same cover artwork designed by Stuart Kusher, Richard Germinaro and Vigon Nahas Vigon. It features pieces recorded in 1965, seven in studio and one live. All the tracks were previously unissued in these mixes ("Joy" and "Living Space" having previously appeared with orchestral overdubs arranged by Alice Coltrane on the 1972 album Infinity) at the time of release. At present, the availability of said tracks is as follows:

- "Feelin' Good" and "Nature Boy": The John Coltrane Quartet Plays CD reissue
- "Dusk Dawn": Kulu Sé Mama CD reissue and Living Space
- "Living Space", "Untitled 90320" and "Untitled 90314": Living Space
- "Joy": First Meditations CD reissue 
- "My Favorite Things": CD reissue of New Thing at Newport and My Favorite Things: Coltrane at Newport

Track listing
"Feelin' Good" – 6:24
"My Favorite Things" – 14:43
"Living Space"	- 10:20
"Untitled 90320" – 10:39
"Untitled 90314" – 14:43
"Dusk Dawn" – 10:44
"Nature Boy" [First Version] –	6:58
"Joy" – 12:14

Personnel
John Coltrane – tenor and soprano saxophone
McCoy Tyner – piano
Art Davis (1 and 7 only), Jimmy Garrison – bass
Elvin Jones – drums

References

Impulse! Records compilation albums
John Coltrane compilation albums
1978 compilation albums
Compilation albums published posthumously